Dipeptidyl peptidase 8 is an enzyme that in humans is encoded by the DPP8 gene.

This gene encodes a member of the peptidase S9B family, a small family of dipeptidyl peptidases that are able to cleave peptide substrates at a prolyl bond. The encoded protein shares similarity with Dipeptidyl peptidase-4 in that it is ubiquitously expressed, and hydrolyzes the same substrates. These similarities suggest that, like dipeptidyl peptidase IV, this protein may play a role in T-cell activation and immune function. Alternatively spliced transcript variants encoding different isoforms have been described. A relatively specific inhibitor of DPP8 and DPP9, Val-boroPro -, leads to increased activation of the inflammasome though both NLRBP1 and CARD8 and can trigger pyroptosis.

References
Notes

Further reading